Soymovirus is a genus of viruses, in the family Caulimoviridae order Ortervirales. Plants serve as natural hosts. There are four species in this genus.

Taxonomy
The genus contains the following species:
Blueberry red ringspot virus
Cestrum yellow leaf curling virus
Peanut chlorotic streak virus
Soybean chlorotic mottle virus

Structure
Viruses in Soymovirus are non-enveloped, with icosahedral geometries, and T=7 symmetry. The diameter is around 50 nm. Genomes are circular. The genome codes for 8 proteins.

Life cycle
Viral replication is nuclear/cytoplasmic. Replication follows the dsDNA(RT) replication model. The method of transcription is dsDNA(RT) transcription. The virus exits the host cell by nuclear pore export, and tubule-guided viral movement. Plants serve as the natural host. The virus is transmitted via a vector (aphid insects). Transmission routes are mechanical.

References

External links
 Viralzone: Soymovirus
 ICTV

Caulimoviridae
Virus genera